Cheong U (born 1957) is the Secretary for Social Affairs and Culture of Macau. Previously he served as the head of Commission Against Corruption of Macau.

Born in China, Cheong went to Hou Kong Secondary School and obtained his bachelor's degree in public administration at the University of Macau's National Institute of Public Administration of Portugal and a Master of Public Administration from Zhongshan University in Guangzhou.

Cheong was a member of the Second Municipal Council of Macao and held other political titles:

 Director of public health and environment of the Municipal Islands Council
 appointed member of the Municipal Islands Assembly
 Vice-chairman of the Executive Committee of the Municipal Islands Council
 member of the Municipal Islands Assembly
 Deputy Secretary-general of the Macao Association of Public Administration

Prior to the handover Cheong served in China related positions:

 Member of the Selection Committee for the first government of MSAR

References
 Information on the major officials and the Procurator-General of the MSAR

1957 births
Living people
Government ministers of Macau
University of Macau alumni